Harry Raymond Munt (31 October 1902 – 27 December 1965) was an English first-class cricketer, active 1923–30, who played for Middlesex. He was born in Paddington; died in Derby.

References

1902 births
1965 deaths
English cricketers
Middlesex cricketers
English cricketers of 1919 to 1945
Sir Julien Cahn's XI cricketers